Poon Yiu Cheuk (born 19 September 1977 in Hong Kong) is a Hong Kong football manager and former professional player.

Club career

Sham Shui Po
Poon left South China to join Sham Shui Po during the summer of 2011. He was the most experienced local player at the club and was appointed as the club captain. Besides, he also coached Sham Shui Po U-19 when he joined the club.

Pegasus
Poon joined Pegasus during the winter transfer window. He also became the assistant coach at the club.

Honours
Happy Valley
Hong Kong First Division: 1998–99, 2000–01, 2002–03, 2005–06
Hong Kong Senior Shield: 1997–98, 2003–04
Hong Kong FA Cup: 1999–00, 2003–04

South China
Hong Kong First Division: 2007–08, 2008–09, 2009–10
Hong Kong Senior Shield: 2009–10
Hong Kong FA Cup: 2010–11

Career statistics

Club career
As at 31 August 2012

International career
As of 17 November 2010.

Notes and references

External links
 Poon Yiu Cheuk at HKFA
 SouthChinaFC.com, 3. 潘耀焯 

1977 births
Living people
Hong Kong footballers
Hong Kong international footballers
Association football defenders
Hong Kong Rangers FC players
Happy Valley AA players
South China AA players
Hong Kong First Division League players
Sham Shui Po SA players
TSW Pegasus FC players
Hong Kong football managers
Footballers at the 1998 Asian Games
Footballers at the 2002 Asian Games
Asian Games competitors for Hong Kong
Hong Kong League XI representative players